Al Wickland (January 27, 1888 – March 14, 1980) was an outfielder in Major League Baseball.

In 444 games over five seasons, Wickland posted a .270 batting average (397-for-1468) with 212 runs, 58 doubles, 38 triples, 12 home runs, 144 RBIs, 58 stolen bases, 207 bases on balls, .364 on-base percentage and .386 slugging percentage. He finished his career with a .968 fielding percentage playing at all three outfield positions.

Sources

1888 births
1980 deaths
Major League Baseball left fielders
Major League Baseball right fielders
Cincinnati Reds players
Chicago Whales players
Pittsburgh Rebels players
Boston Braves players
New York Yankees players
Grand Rapids Furniture Makers players
Newark Newks players
Indianapolis Indians players
Toledo Mud Hens players
Baseball players from Chicago
People from Port Washington, Wisconsin